

Group A

Delegation
 Under-17 Technical Director: Geovanny Alfaro HERNANDEZT
 Assistant Coach: Jorge Manuel ULATE
 Goalkeeper Coach: Frank CARRILLO
 Delegate: Mario MUÑOZ
 Doctor: Gerardo ARTAVIA
 Trainer: Geonnathan FERNANDEZ
 Massage Therapist: Geovanny CARILLO
 Equipment Manager: Olman MONTERO

Delegation
 Head of Delegation: Israel PERERA
 Under-17 Technical Director: Manuel RODRIGUEZ
 Assistant Coaches: Carlos RAMIREZ, Luis Miguel SEARA
 Press Officer: Sergio Enrique ORTEGA
 Doctor: Carlos GONZALEZ
 Psychologist: Lázaro Chi GONZALEZ

Delegation
 Head of Delegation: Jose Humberto TORRES
 Under-17 Technical Director: Raul COCHERARI
 Assistant Coach: Remberto SANTILLANA
 Goalkeeper Coach: Carlos Felipe CAÑADAS
 Delegate: Hugo Orlando VILLALTA
 Doctor: Francisco AMAYA
 Trainer: Manuel Jaime GARCIA
 Equipment Manager: Abraham DIAZ

Delegation
 Under-17 Technical Director: John HACKWORTH
 Assistant Coaches: Raul DIAZ-ARCE, Keith FULK, Tim Mulqueen
 Coordinator: Thomas NORTON
 Press Officer: Neil BUETHE
 Doctor: Mark SILBEY
 Trainer: Michael WHITE
 Equipment Manager: Timothy RYDER

Group B

Delegation
 Head of Delegation: Jim FLEMING
 Under-17 Technical Director: Stephen HART
 Assistant Coach: Sean FLEMING
 Goalkeeper Coach: Djamel LAARABI
 Coordinator: Earl COCHRANE
 Delegate: David MONSALVE
 Trainer: Anthony PELLEGRINO
 Tutor: Mark SWEETAPPLE

Delegation
 Head of Delegation: Yves JEAN-BART
 Under-17 Technical Director: Jean Yves LABZE
 Assistant Coach: James MORISSET
 Delegates: Antoine CRAAM, Jean Roosevelt DUCASSE, Claudio FREAN, Osvaldo GUITIERREZ

Delegation
 Head of Delegation: Vicente WILLIAMS
 Under-17 Technical Director: Miguel ESCALANTE
 Assistant Coach: Angel Antonio OBANDO
 Goalkeeper Coach: Marcelo SCALLESI
 Manager: Miguel Angel CASTILLO
 Press Officer: Edwin BANEGAS
 Trainers: Luis Gustavo CABRERA, Augusto MORENO
 Equipment Manager: Jesus GARCIA

Delegation
 Head of Delegation: Guillermo Luis CANTU
 Under-17 Technical Director: Jesus RAMIREZ
 Head of Administration: Ricardo MARTINEZ
 Press Officer: Mauricio ZAVALA
 Doctor: Gonzalo LUNA
 Trainer: Jesus ZAMUDIO
 Security Officer: Alfonso SILVA

References

Squads
CONCACAF U-17 Championship squads